Giorgio Ardisson,  best known as George Ardisson (31 December 1931 – 11 December 2014), was an Italian actor.

Life and career 
Born in Turin, Ardisson debuted in a minor role in Mauro Bolognini's 1959 film Arrangiatevi!.  After several secondary roles in sword-and-sandal and adventure films, he gained a huge success playing Agent 3S3 in the eurospy films Agent 3S3: Passport to Hell and Agent 3S3, Massacre in the Sun. According to director Sergio Sollima he was chosen for this role thanks to his physical appearance that made him credible as American. 

Later Ardisson starred in several more spy films and spanned different genres, including Spaghetti Western and Italo-horror films.

Partial filmography 

 You're on Your Own (1959) - Walter
 Morgan, the Pirate (1960)
 The Last of the Vikings (1961) - Guntar
 Hercules in the Haunted World (1961) - Teseo
 Erik the Conqueror (1961) - Erik
 Zorro in the Court of Spain (1962) - Riccardo Di Villa Verde / Zorro
 A Queen for Caesar (1962) - Achilles
 Twist, lolite e vitelloni (1962) - Massimo Mauri
 Katarsis (1963) - Gugo, the poet
 Grand Canyon Massacre (1964)
 The Long Hair of Death (1965) - Baron Kurt Humboldt
 Agent 3S3: Passport to Hell (1965) - Walter Ross, Agent 3S3
 Hercules and the Princess of Troy (1965, TV Movie) - Leander
 Juliet of the Spirits (1965) - Dolores' model
 Operation Counterspy (1965) - Lord George Moriston 
 Agent 3S3: Massacre in the Sun (1966) - Walter Ross, Agent 3S3
 Countdown to Doomsday (1966) - Jeff Milton
 Omicidio per appuntamento (1967) - Vince Dreyser
  (1967) - Patrick Gordon
 Either All or None (1968) - Amen / Johnny
 May God Forgive You... But I Won't (1968) - Cjamango McDonald
 Zorro the Fox (1968) - Don Diego di Alcantara / Zorro
 Una ragazza di Praga (1969) - Adam Kryl
 Django Defies Sartana (1970) - Sartana
 A Suitcase for a Corpse (1970) - Clive Ardington
 Chapaqua's Gold (1970) - Doc Harrison
 Die Weibchen (1970) - Tommy
 L'uomo più velenoso del cobra (1971) - Tony Garden
 La vergine di Bali (1972) - David Rank
 Sixteen (1973) - Giorgio
 Commissariato di notturna (1974) - Amedeo Furlan aka il Laureando
 La nipote (1974) - Piero / Luigi's friend
 Ciak si muore (1974) - Inspector Menzel
 Il torcinaso (1975) - Police Chief
 La guerre du pétrole n'aura pas lieu (1975) - Trudot
 Faccia di spia (1975) - Patrick
 Una vergine in famiglia (1975) - Ivan Fnrnesi
 Lo stallone (1975) - Guido, padre di Daniela
 L'ingenua (1975) - Piero Spazin
 Il signor Ministro li pretese tutti e subito (1977) - Pietro Santini
 Polizia selvaggia (1977)
 L'assassino speranza delle donne (1977)
 Eyes Behind the Stars (1978) - Agent for 'The Silencers'
 Supersexymarket (1979)
 Il viziaccio (1980)
 Las verdes vacaciones de una familia bien (1980) - Mario Nicosia
 Eroina (1980) - The Trafficant
 Carcerato (1981) - The Police Commissioner
 Don't Look in the Attic (1982) - Casati
 Pin il monello (1982)
 Apocalisse di un terremoto (1982) - Anthony Starace
 Amok (1983) - Le chef de la police
 La donna del mare (1984) - Alfred Wanfel
 I mercenari raccontano (1985)
 Cattivi Pierrot (1985) - Victim
 Delitti (1987) - Chief of Police
 La trasgressione (1987)
 Cross of the Seven Jewels (1987) - Boss from Sicily
 La tempesta (1988)
 La vendetta (1989) - Agent Roberts
 Viaggio di nozze in giallo (1990)
 Una donna da guardare (1991) - prof. Mueller
 Shadow Warriors (1992) - Ninja Master (final film role)

References

Further reading 
  Matt Blake. Giorgio Ardisson: The Italian James Bond.  The WildEye Press, 2014. .

External links 
 

1931 births
2014 deaths
Italian male film actors
Actors from Turin
20th-century Italian male actors
People from Rocca Canavese